Allan Arenfeldt Olesen (born 20 May 1982) is a Danish professional football player in the defender position. He has played for a number of Danish clubs and won the 2002 Danish Superliga championship with Brøndby IF. Olesen has played 42 games and scored three goals for various Danish national youth selections, including 15 games and one goal for the Denmark national under-21 football team. He was named 2000 Danish under-19 Talent of the Year, and represented Denmark at the 2001 European Under-19 Championship.

Biography
Olesen started his senior career with multiple Danish champions Brøndby IF. He made his Danish Superliga debut for Brøndby in September 2000, and went on to play 47 league games for the club until May 2004. He played four of 33 games as Brøndby won the 2001–02 Superliga championship, and helped Brøndby win the 2003 Danish Cup trophy.

While at Brøndby, Olesen made his international debut with the Danish under-19 national team in September 1999, and went on to play 22 games and score two goals for the team. He was named 2000 Danish under-19 Talent of the Year, and represented Denmark at the 2001 European Under-19 Championship, playing three games at the tournament. He made his Danish under-21 national team debut in April 2002, and went on to play 15 games and score one goal for the under-21 selection until November 2003.

In July 2004, Olesen joined Superliga club FC Nordsjælland. He played 109 league games and scored one goal for the club, before leaving Nordsjælland in June 2008. He joined league rivals Randers FC, and played 20 league games in his first season at the club. In his second season with Randers, Olesen was deemed surplus to requirements and did not play any league games for the club in the first half of the 2009–10 Superliga season. In February 2010, Olesen signed a one-year contract with Norwegian Premier League club Haugesund FK.

Honours
2000 Danish under-19 Talent of the Year
2001–02 Danish Superliga
2003 Danish Cup

References

External links
 Danish national team profile
 Fremad Amager profile

1982 births
Living people
Danish men's footballers
Denmark under-21 international footballers
Denmark youth international footballers
Brøndby IF players
FC Nordsjælland players
Randers FC players
Danish Superliga players
IFK Mariehamn players
Veikkausliiga players
Expatriate footballers in Finland
Danish expatriate men's footballers
Åtvidabergs FF players
Allsvenskan players
Expatriate footballers in Sweden
Eliteserien players
FK Haugesund players
Expatriate footballers in Norway
Association football defenders
Footballers from Copenhagen